Yeshiva Maharsha Beis Aharon is a Haredi Community based in Fairmount, Johannesburg. The community was founded in 1982 by the late Rabbi Aharon Pfeuffer (for whom the Yeshiva was later named), and is Headed by Rabbi M. Raff. The Yeshiva comprises a Beit Midrash. It also operates a pre-primary, and primary and high schools for boys and girls. In 2014, the synagogue and school facilities were renovated.

See also
Jewish education in South Africa under History of the Jews in South Africa
Orthodox yeshivas in South Africa

References
Johannesburg - Africa's Premier Jewish City

Schools in Johannesburg
Jewish schools in South Africa
Orthodox yeshivas in South Africa
Jews and Judaism in Johannesburg